Robert N. Trebits was a researcher in radar-related technologies, and was director of the Sensors and Electromagnetic Applications Laboratory at the Georgia Tech Research Institute (GTRI) from around 1991 until 2006 (15 years) and worked at GTRI from 1972 to 2006 (35 years).

Education
Trebits held a Ph.D. from the Georgia Institute of Technology.

Career
Trebits joined the Georgia Tech Research Institute in 1972, and became the director of the Sensors and Electromagnetic Applications Laboratory around 1991. He retired from GTRI in 2006.

Trebits has since been an adjunct professor at the Southern Polytechnic State University.

Memberships and awards
Trebits was involved in SPIE, in particular being the editor of several publications. In 1997, he was named an IEEE Fellow "for contributions and leadership in measuring and characterizing millimeter radar reflectivity and propagation effects".

References

Georgia Tech Research Institute people
Georgia Tech faculty
Fellow Members of the IEEE
Living people
Year of birth missing (living people)